Christopher Taylor (born October 1, 1999) is a Jamaican 400 metre runner. He won the 400 metres event at the 2015 World Youth Championships in Athletics in Cali, Colombia in 45.27 seconds, a Jamaica Youth Record. Taylor also won the U-18 400 metres at the 2015 CARIFTA Games in a championship record time of 46.64. On March 19, 2016, Christopher Taylor delivered an extraordinary performance at the ISSA High School Championships in Jamaica, breaking national records and making a massive contribution in bringing his school, Calabar High School, to their 7th consecutive victory. He also won the 2018 Jamaica Senior National Championships with a personal best and NJR of 44.88.

He won the 400 m hurdles silver medal and the gold in 4x100 m and 4x400 m mixed relays in the 2021 NACAC U23 Championships.

References

External links
 

1999 births
Living people
Jamaican male sprinters
Place of birth missing (living people)
Jamaican Athletics Championships winners
Athletes (track and field) at the 2020 Summer Olympics
Olympic athletes of Jamaica
People from Spanish Town